Triplophysa daryoae, known as the Sokh stone loach, is a species of ray-finned fish in the family Nemacheilidae. It is endemic to the Sokh River in Fergana Valley, Uzbekistan. It lives in fast-flowing rivers over 1050m in altitude.

Description 
It grows to 94mm SL. Eyes are present. Mouth is inferior. Gill rakers are absent in outer row, however, 9–10 gill rakers are found in the inner row on the first-gill arch. Scales are absent on the body. The lateral line is complete. Elongated body is slightly compressed anteriorly and strongly compressed posteriorly. Lips thick with furrows and papillae. Three pairs of barbels are present. Dorsal and anal fins are convex. Pectoral fins are developed. Caudal fin truncate and the tips are rounded.

References 

daryoae
Freshwater fish of Asia
Fish of Central Asia
Fish described in 2022
Taxobox binomials not recognized by IUCN